Geophilus arenarius is a species of soil centipede in the family Geophilidae found in northwest Africa, specifically near Annaba, Algeria. This species is frequently misidentified with G. electricus, and as part of the carpophagus species-complex, is closely related to both G. carpophagus and G. easoni, though it differs mainly by lacking a transverse suture on the head and peculiar integumental features (carpophagus-structures) along the trunk, as well as having relatively stouter antennae and forcipular coxosternite. G. arenarius is distinctly smaller at full growth than G. carpophagus, with usually blunter and more sclerotised tubercles lining the intermediate part of the labrum and a minute denticle at the basis of the forcipular tarsungula. It has fewer bristles lining the lateral parts of the labrum than G. easoni as well as a generally higher number of legs and a more greyish coloured trunk. An examination of 36 G. arenarius syntypes (16 females and 20 males) indicates that males of this species have 55 pairs of legs, whereas females have 55 to 59 leg pairs, with 57 as the most common number.

References 

arenarius
Animals described in 1870
Taxa named by Frederik Vilhelm August Meinert